The Ruger AR-556 is a semiautomatic AR-15 style rifle manufactured by U.S. firearms company Sturm, Ruger & Co. Introduced in 2014 as an entry-level AR-15 using a direct impingement action, with variants since being released such as the upgraded AR-556 MPR (multi-purpose rifle) in 2017 and the AR-556 pistol in 2019.

Overview 
The standard model makes use of a traditional direct impingement with a  carbine length gas system and has a cold hammer forged 4140 chrome-moly steel barrel with 1: twist rifling and a birdcage style flash hider. The bolt is machined from 9310 alloy steel, and the furniture included is a CAR-15 style handguard without aluminum heatshields, an M4 buttstock, and a Ruger designed pistol grip. The included sights are a fixed front sight post and a Ruger Rapid Deploy rear flip-up sight. The gas block and sight post design is proprietary to Ruger and includes a quick detach sling swivel socket and bayonet lug.

The MPR model uses a  mid-length gas system and a radial port muzzle brake, and also includes a free-float handguard with M-LOK accessory slots and a continuous top picatinny rail, and either a Magpul or B5 Systems buttstock and pistol grip.

The AR-556 Pistol has a  barrel with a free float handguard with M-LOK slots and an SB Tactical SBA3 Pistol Stabilizing Brace, and is also available in .300 AAC Blackout and .350 Legend.

All models include a standard 30 round Magpul PMAG in the box, except those sold in states with magazine capacity limits where a 10 round aluminum magazine is included.

See also 
 Ruger SR-556
 Ruger Mini-14
 Ruger 10/22

References

External links 
Ruger official website

.300 BLK firearms
5.56×45mm NATO semi-automatic rifles
Rifles of the United States
ArmaLite AR-10 derivatives
Weapons and ammunition introduced in 2014